Typhis phillipensis is a species of sea snail, a marine gastropod mollusk in the family Muricidae, the murex snails or rock snails.

Description
The length of the shell attains .

Distribution
This marine species occurs off Australia

References

 Houart, R, Buge, B. & Zuccon, D. (2021). A taxonomic update of the Typhinae (Gastropoda: Muricidae) with a review of New Caledonia species and the description of new species from New Caledonia, the South China Sea and Western Australia. Journal of Conchology. 44(2): 103–147.

External links
 Watson, R. B. (1879-1883). Mollusca of H.M.S. 'Challenger' Expedition. Journal of the Linnean Society of London. 14: 506-529, 586-605, 692-716

Typhis
Gastropods described in 1883